Jake Stormoen is an American actor known for his role as Dagen in the Mythica film series and as Captain Garret Spears in the fantasy-adventure drama television series The Outpost.

Early life and career
Jacob Leif Stormoen was born in Minneapolis, Minnesota, US. to parents of Norwegian descent. Stormoen grew up in Minneapolis along with his younger sister Anna Stormoen. After graduating from high school in the U.S, he enrolled at the University of Southern Queensland in Toowoomba, Queensland, Australia, where he obtained a Bsc Arts in Creative Media.  After being a waiter for 6 months, he returned to the United States, to Los Angeles, California to pursue a career in acting. Stormoen is friends with Kristian Nairn, the actor who plays Hodor in Game of Thrones, the friendship developed online whilst in High school, playing World of Warcraft (WoW). Stormoen later co-starred with Nairn in the Kurt Knight horror thriller film The Appearance in 2018. In 2015, Stormoen won the ‘Best Supporting Actor’ award at the Utah Film Festival for his performance as Airk in the fantasy film The Christmas Dragon. Apart from acting, he has also worked as a writer and associate producer in a couple of short films.

In 2014, Stormoen landed his first major role as Dagen in the Arrowstorm  fantasy-adventure drama film Mythica: A Quest for Heroes, a franchise where he starred in 4 more films, Mythica: The Necromancer and Mythica: The Darkspore in 2015, then Mythica: The Godslayer and Mythica: The Iron Crown in 2016. Stormoen's inherent love for and being a life-long fan of fantasy and science fiction, is the main reason why he enjoys working for the Utah-based production company, Arrowstorm Entertainment, because they specialise in that genre.

In 2018, Stormoen continued his success with Arrowstorm Entertainment in a lead role as Captain Garret Spears in The CW's fantasy-adventure drama television series The Outpost',' alongside Jessica Green and Anand Desai-Barochia. The CW announced that series 3 of The Outpost'' will be extended by a further 13 episodes in 2020.

Filmography

Film

Television

Video games

Video

Awards and nominations

References

External links 
 
 Jake Stormoen Instagram
Jake Stormoen twitter

21st-century American actors
American male film actors
American male television actors
Living people
Male actors from Minneapolis
Male actors from Minnesota
People from Minneapolis
People from Minnesota
University of Southern Queensland alumni
Year of birth missing (living people)